A partial lunar eclipse took place on 16 August 2008, the second of two lunar eclipses in 2008, with the first being a total eclipse on 20 February 2008. The next lunar eclipse was a penumbral eclipse occurring on 9 February 2009, while the next total lunar eclipse occurred on 21 December 2010.

The moon's apparent diameter was 26.2 arcseconds smaller than the 21 February 2008 total lunar eclipse.

Eclipse Season 

This is the second eclipse this season.

First eclipse this season: 1 August 2008 Total Solar Eclipse

Viewing

Parts of Australia saw it begin before sunrise, while parts of South America saw it end just after sunset.
The eclipse is also seen in the Philippines and other parts of Asia at moonset. Parts of Europe, the Middle East and Africa saw it when it is visible.

The penumbral eclipse began at 18:23 UTC, with the partial eclipse beginning at 19:36. The time of greatest eclipse was 21:10. The partial eclipse ended at 22:44, and the penumbral eclipse will ended at 23:57.

The planet Neptune was 2 days past opposition, visible in binoculars as an 8th magnitude "star" just two degrees west and slightly south of the moon.

Map

Relation to other lunar eclipses

Eclipses of 2008 
 An annular solar eclipse on 7 February.
 A total lunar eclipse on 21 February.
 A total solar eclipse on 1 August.
 A partial lunar eclipse on 16 August.

Lunar year series

Saros series

Metonic cycle (19 years)

Half-Saros cycle 
A lunar eclipse will be preceded and followed by solar eclipses by 9 years and 5.5 days (a half saros). This lunar eclipse is related to two total solar eclipses of Solar Saros 145.

Photo

Progression from Oslo, Norway

See also
 List of lunar eclipses and List of 21st-century lunar eclipses
 Solar eclipse of August 1, 2008
 :File:2008-08-16 Lunar Eclipse Sketch.gif Chart

Notes

External links
 NASA: Partial Lunar Eclipse: August 16, 2008
 NASA
 
 Hermit eclipse (Ian Cameron Smith) Partial Lunar Eclipse: August 16, 2008
 Sky&Telescope, Eclipses of 2008
 Animation of lunar eclipse 16 August 2008
 APOD August 20, 2008, 
 Composite photos showing Earth's shadow
 Spaceweather.com lunar eclipse gallery

2008-08
2008 in science
August 2008 events